The 1828 Missouri gubernatorial election was held on August 4, 1828.  Governor John Miller was elected unopposed to a full term as governor (having previously won the 1825 special election to succeed Abraham J. Williams, who succeeded the late Frederick Bates).

Results

References

Missouri
1828
Gubernatorial
August 1828 events